John Hind is an Australian Paralympic swimmer. At the 1976 Toronto Games, he competed in five swimming events and won three silver medals in the Men's 25 m Freestyle 2, Men's 25 m Butterfly 2 and Men's 3 x 25 m Individual Medley 2.

References 

Male Paralympic swimmers of Australia
Swimmers at the 1984 Summer Paralympics
Paralympic silver medalists for Australia
Living people
Year of birth missing (living people)
Medalists at the 1976 Summer Paralympics
Paralympic medalists in swimming
Australian male freestyle swimmers
Australian male butterfly swimmers
20th-century Australian people